The 35th Women's Boat Race took place on 23 March 1980. The contest was between crews from the Universities of Oxford and Cambridge and held as part of the Henley Boat Races along a two-kilometre course.

Background
The first Women's Boat Race was conducted on The Isis in 1927.

Race
Oxford won by two and a half lengths.

See also
The Boat Race 1980

References

External links
 Official website

Women's Boat Race
1980 in English sport
Boat
March 1980 sports events in the United Kingdom
1980 in women's rowing